CB Bank is one of Myanmar's oldest and largest commercial banks. It became the first bank in Myanmar to issue ATM cards and credit cards. The bank, led by U Khin Mg Aye (Chairman) and U Kyaw Lynn (CEO) has over 200 branches across the country.

History
The CB Bank was established on 21 August 1992 with the permission of the Central Bank of Myanmar. It started as a small bank with 33 employees and has around 7000 in 2016. In 2004, it became a public company. The CB Bank's head office is located in the Botahtaung township area of Yangon.

In May 2013, CB Bank became the first bank in Myanmar to issue a debit card and permitted the first card-related financial transaction in Myanmar. In September 2012, Mastercard signed an agreement with CB Bank to license cards in the country and this enabled local merchants and ATMs to accept the payment cards. In 2013, CB Bank switched to T24 from Temenos as its core banking system to enhance bank-wide connectivity with the branches in the country. The bank named the ATM service as EASI Banking. The bank has the largest network of ATM and Foreign Exchange Counters in Myanmar.

After signing the contract with the Asian Development Bank (ADB) under the Trade Finance Program, CB Bank received $12 million for its Trade financing program in October 2015. It allowed the bank to issue Letter of Credit agreement, which allowed exporters to ship products before receiving payment under CB Bank’s trade finance lines, guaranteed by ADB.

CB Bank also started offering mobile banking services to the personnel and corporate clients which include basic banking functions, remote access banking services and mobile airtime top-ups are available through the app. It launched Easi Mobile Banking Agent for areas in Myanmar where there is no branch coverage. Mobile agents will receive 30 percent of normal money transfer and 50 percent for other services. CB Bank partnered with Myanmar Post Office in 2017 to further expand its mobile agent services at post offices. 

From 2016, CB Bank and other several banks started offering loans for SMEs in collaboration with Japanese Government and state-owned Myanmar Insurance. Additionally, CB Bank was chosen by German KfW bank to provide 4.45 EUR million worth of loans for SMEs in Myanmar based on market study and due diligence offer SME or loans with or without collateral.

In January 2017, CB Bank signed an agreement with Diebold Nixdorf for systems, software and services to expand its cardless cash withdrawal services and P2P offerings to self-service banking in Myanmar. CB bank, already hosting one of the largest ATM networks in Myanmar, has planned to double the number of terminals to expend its self-service network.

In August 2017, Grab, an online cab aggregator partnered with CB Bank to offer banking services available to its drivers. The drivers have benefitted from the program obtaining access to ATM cards and bank accounts.  In September 2017, it announced partnership with telecom operator Ooredoo to launch, M-Pitesan, a mobile wallet which will offer nationwide money transfer and bill payments services.

In September 2017, CB bank launched the contactless payment system in collaboration with Visa and Mastercard the payment service providers. The service help users to complete their payments through contactless POS machines for Visa and Mastercard.

In January 2018, CB Bank opened the first small and medium enterprise (SME) center in Mandalay. Through (SME) centers, CB Bank aims to help SMEs apply for necessary loans. Plans of SME loans include SME-Credit Guarantee Insurance Loan (SME CGI Loan), SME Longterm Investment Loan Powered by JICA, SME Business Expansion Loan Powered by KfW, and SME Term Loan.

In April 2018, CB Bank signed an agreement with KfW Development Bank (KfW) to extend loans with $13.22 million to finance small and medium-sized enterprises in Myanmar.

In May 2019, CB Bank and Telenor Myanmar signed a partnership with Visa to launch the CB-Telenor co-branded Visa credit card which aims to enhance financial services in Myanmar and expand benefits for Telenor Star Platinum users.

In October 2019, CB Bank announced that it will launch its innovation lab on the APIX platform making it the first bank in the ASEAN region to connect with an open-architecture. In May 2020, CB Bank became the first bank in Myanmar to open smart branch at the Kantharyar Center. Similar to self-checkouts, customers can open their own bank accounts and get debit/prepaid cards immediately with minimal interactions with bank staffs.

Partnerships 
In September 2019, CB Bank partnered with England based professional football club, Manchester United to become their official financial services partner for Myanmar. It launched the Manchester United branded prepaid cards, debit cards and credit cards in Myanmar. 

In March 2020, to support digital and cashless payments in Myanmar, CB Bank becomes the first bank in Myanmar to support MSME portal in partnership with MasterCard and the Myanmar government. In September 2020, it partnered with Infobip and Viber to launch Myanmar’s first banking service on the Viber community platform. This helped bank to replace traditional call center agents with virtual personal assistants.

Major awards 

 2019 Best Service Provider - Trade Finance Myanmar by The Asset
 2019 Best Corporate & Investment Bank in Myanmar by Asia Money
 2019 Best for Premium Banking Service by Asia Money
 2019 Best Bank in Myanmar by Global Finance
 2019 Best Digital Bank by the World Finance
 2019 Best Mobile Banking (CB Pay) by the World Finance
 2019 Financial Inclusion: CB Bank Mobile Agent Banking
 2018 Best Trade Finance in Myanmar by The Asset
 2018 Best Trade Finance Bank in Myanmar
 2018 Best Cash Management Bank in Myanmar
 2018 Best Bank in Myanmar by Asia Money
 2018 Best Digital Bank in Myanmar by Asia Money
 2018 Best Corporate and Investment Bank in Myanmar by Asia Money
 2018 Best Bank for SMEs in Myanmar by Asia Money
 2017 Best Structured Trade Finance in Myanmar by The Asset
 2017 Best Digital Bank in Myanmar by Asia Money
 2017 Best Digital Bank and Best Mobile Banking Application by the World Finance
 2016 Best Digital Bank and Best Mobile Banking Application by the World Finance
 2016 The Asset Triple A for ‘Best Trade Finance Bank in Myanmar
 2016 Best Bank in Myanmar
 2015 Best Bank in Myanmar
 2014 Best Corporate Bank in Myanmar
 2013 The Industry Leadership Award

References

External links 
 

Banks of Myanmar
Banks established in 1992
1992 establishments in Myanmar
Companies based in Yangon